Together is a studio album by pianists Tommy Flanagan and Kenny Barron which was digitally recorded in late 1978 and first released on the Japanese Denon label in 1979.

Reception 

In his review on AllMusic, Scott Yanow notes "The two masterful pianists perform six vintage jazz standards with plenty of swing and spontaneous moments yet without making the ensembles too cluttered or crowded. In addition to their talents, both Flanagan and Barron prove to have very alert ears. Recommended".

Track listing 
 "Dig" (Miles Davis) – 4:34
 "If I Should Lose You" (Ralph Rainger, Leo Robin) – 8:05
 "Stella by Starlight" (Victor Young, Ned Washington) – 5:54
 "I Can't Get Started" (Vernon Duke, Ira Gershwin) – 6:21
 "Darn That Dream" (Jimmy Van Heusen, Eddie DeLange) – 5:31
 "The Way You Look Tonight" (Dorothy Fields, Jerome Kern) – 7:12

Personnel 
Tommy Flanagan, Kenny Barron – piano

References 

Kenny Barron albums
Tommy Flanagan albums
1979 albums
Denon Records albums
Collaborative albums